This is a list of 140 species in the genus Pissodes, conifer weevils.

Pissodes species

 Pissodes abietis Ratzeburg, 1837 c
 Pissodes affinis Randall, 1838 i c b
 Pissodes alascensis Hopkins, 1911 c
 Pissodes albosignatus Dejean, 1821 c
 Pissodes annulatus Dejean, 1821 c
 Pissodes apiatus Dejean, 1821 c
 Pissodes approximatus Hopkins, 1911 i c b  (northern pine weevil)
 Pissodes araliae Montrouzier, 1860 c
 Pissodes argus Sturm, 1826 c
 Pissodes armatus Sturm, 1826 c
 Pissodes barberi Hopkins, 1911 i c
 Pissodes bellicosus Sturm, 1826 c
 Pissodes bimaculatus Sturm, 1826 c
 Pissodes brasiliensis Cristofori & Jan, 1832 c
 Pissodes brunneus Dalla Torre & Schenkling, 1932 c
 Pissodes bufo Germar, 1817 c
 Pissodes burkei Hopkins, 1911 i c
 Pissodes californicus Hopkins, 1911 i c
 Pissodes canadensis Hopkins, 1911 c
 Pissodes castaneus (DeGeer, C., 1775) c g
 Pissodes caucasicus Roubal, 1923 c
 Pissodes cembrae Motschulsky, V. de, 1860 c
 Pissodes championi O'Brien, 1989 c
 Pissodes cheni Lu, Zhang & Langor, 2007 c
 Pissodes cibriani O'Brien, 1989 c
 Pissodes circularis Sturm, 1826 c
 Pissodes collaris Sturm, 1826 c
 Pissodes coloradensis Hopkins, 1911 i c
 Pissodes conspersus Dejean, 1821 c
 Pissodes coronatus Dejean, 1821 c
 Pissodes costatus Mannerheim, 1852 i c
 Pissodes creutzeri Germar, E.F., 1824 c
 Pissodes cribrosus Sturm, 1826 c
 Pissodes curriei Hopkins, 1911 c
 Pissodes cylindricus Sturm, 1826 c
 Pissodes dealbatus Sturm, 1826 c
 Pissodes deodarae Hopkins, 1911 c
 Pissodes dubius Randall, 1838 c
 Pissodes echinatus Sturm, 1826 c
 Pissodes effossus Heyden, C. von, 1858 c g
 Pissodes engelmanni Hopkins, 1911 c
 Pissodes erythrocephalus Sturm, 1826 c
 Pissodes erythrorhynchus Germar, 1824 c
 Pissodes fabricii Stephens, 1829 c
 Pissodes fasciatus LeConte, 1876 i c
 Pissodes femoratus Sturm, 1826 c
 Pissodes ferrugineus Rey, C., 1895 c
 Pissodes fiskei Hopkins, 1911 i c
 Pissodes flammiger Germar, 1824 c
 Pissodes fraseri Hopkins, 1911 c
 Pissodes galloisi Kôno, 1928 c
 Pissodes guatemaltecus Voss, 1955 c
 Pissodes gyllenhali Gyllenhal, L. in Schönherr, C.J., 1836 c
 Pissodes gyllenhalii Gyllenhal, 1835 c
 Pissodes harcyniae (Herbst, J.F.W., 1795) c g
 Pissodes henningseni Voss, 1972 c
 Pissodes hercyniae Dejean, 1821 c
 Pissodes hispidus Sturm, 1826 c
 Pissodes insignatus Boheman, 1843 c
 Pissodes interruptus Pic, 1937 c
 Pissodes interstitiosus Dalla Torre & Schenkling, 1932 c
 Pissodes irroratus Reitter, E., 1899 c
 Pissodes japonicus Niishima, 1915 c
 Pissodes juniperi Dejean, 1821 c
 Pissodes laevigatus Sturm, 1826 c
 Pissodes laricinus Motschulsky, V. de, 1860 c
 Pissodes macellus Germar, 1824 c
 Pissodes marginalis Dejean, 1821 c
 Pissodes marmoreus Dejean, 1821 c
 Pissodes mexicanus O'Brien, 1989 c
 Pissodes multiguttatus Dejean, 1821 c
 Pissodes multisignatus Dejean, 1821 c
 Pissodes murrayanae Hopkins, 1911 i c
 Pissodes myops Cristofori & Jan, 1832 c
 Pissodes nebulosus Sturm, 1826 c
 Pissodes nemorensis Germar, 1824 i c b  (eastern pine weevil)
 Pissodes nigrae Hopkins, 1911 c
 Pissodes nitidus Roelofs, W., 1874 c
 Pissodes notatus Sturm, 1826 c
 Pissodes obscurus Dejean, 1821 c
 Pissodes obsoletus Sturm, 1826 c
 Pissodes ocellatus Dejean, 1821 c
 Pissodes ochraceus Van Dyke, 1927 i c
 Pissodes oculatus Dejean, 1821 c
 Pissodes onychinus Germar, 1824 c
 Pissodes ornatus Sturm, 1826 c
 Pissodes palmes Dalla Torre & Schenkling, 1932 c
 Pissodes piceae Schoenherr, 1825 c
 Pissodes picturatus Germar, 1824 c
 Pissodes pilatsquamosus Lu, Zhang & Langor, 2007 c
 Pissodes pini (Linnaeus, C., 1758) c g
 Pissodes piniphilus Billberg, 1820 c g
 Pissodes piperi Hopkins, 1911 c
 Pissodes planatus Foerster, B., 1891 c g
 Pissodes polymitus Germar, 1824 c
 Pissodes prodigialis Germar, 1824 c
 Pissodes ptinicollis Sturm, 1826 c
 Pissodes pulverosus Dejean, 1821 c
 Pissodes pulverulentus Sturm, 1826 c
 Pissodes punctatus Langor & Zhang in Langor, Situ & Zhang, 1999 c
 Pissodes puncticollis Hopkins, 1911 i c
 Pissodes punctum Sturm, 1826 c
 Pissodes pupillatus Dejean, 1821 c
 Pissodes pygmaeus Curtis, 1840 c
 Pissodes quadrinotatus Sturm, J., 1826 c
 Pissodes radiatae Hopkins, 1911 i c
 Pissodes robustus Van Dyke, 1927 i c
 Pissodes rotundatus LeConte, 1876 i c b  (small spruce weevil)
 Pissodes rotundicollis Desbrochers, J., 1870 c
 Pissodes rufitarsis Dejean, 1821 c
 Pissodes scabricollis Miller, L., 1859 c
 Pissodes schwarzi Hopkins, 1911 i c b  (Yosemite bark weevil)
 Pissodes scutellaris Sturm, 1826 c
 Pissodes sericeus Sturm, 1826 c
 Pissodes setosus Sturm, 1826 c
 Pissodes silvaticus Voss, 1956 c
 Pissodes similis Hopkins, 1911 i c b
 Pissodes sitchensis Hopkins, 1911 c
 Pissodes spinosus Dejean, 1821 c
 Pissodes squamosus LeConte J E, 1824 c
 Pissodes striatulus (Fabricius, 1775) i c g b  (balsam bark weevil)
 Pissodes strobi (Peck, 1817) i c b  (white pine weevil)
 Pissodes strobili Redtenbacher, L., 1849 c
 Pissodes strobyli Redtenbacher, 1849 c
 Pissodes terminalis Hopping, 1920 i c
 Pissodes terribilis Sturm, 1826 c
 Pissodes tesselatus Dejean, 1821 c
 Pissodes tribulus Sturm, 1826 c
 Pissodes tuberculatus Dejean, 1821 c
 Pissodes umbrosus Sturm, 1826 c
 Pissodes undabundus Sturm, 1826 c
 Pissodes undatus Dejean, 1821 c
 Pissodes utahensis Hopkins, 1911 c
 Pissodes validirostris Gyllenhal, 1835 c
 Pissodes variabilis Sturm, 1826 c
 Pissodes verrucosus Sturm, 1826 c
 Pissodes webbi Hopkins, 1911 i c
 Pissodes yosemite Hopkins, 1911 c
 Pissodes yunnanensis Langor & Zhang in Langor, Situ & Zhang, 1999 c
 Pissodes zitacuarense Sleeper, 1969 c

Data sources: i = ITIS, c = Catalogue of Life, g = GBIF, b = Bugguide.net

References

Pissodes